Chris Bart is a former university professor, professional speaker, business consultant and author.

Career
Bart retired from McMaster University's DeGroote School of Business in 2013 after he and 5 other professors were suspended for harassing other faculty in an effort to deny their faculty's Dean a second term.

Bart is co-founder and current chairman of the Caribbean Governance Training Institute and the Caribbean Institute of Directors.

Bart conducted keynote speaking and business consulting through his company, Corporate Missions Inc.

Author
Bart has internationally published more than 190 articles, cases and reviews. He is the author of A Tale of Two Employees and the Person Who Wanted to Lead Them,.

Partial bibliography
Books
 A Tale of Two Employees. Corporate Missions Inc. Press, 2002. .

Monographs
 Twenty Questions for Directors Should Ask about Strategy. Canadian Institute of Chartered Accountants, 2003, .
 Twenty Questions Directors Should Ask about Strategy – Second Edition. Canadian Institute of Chartered Accountants, 2006. .
 Twenty Essential Questions Directors of Not-for-profit Organizations Should Ask about Strategy. Corporate Missions Inc. Press, 2009. .

Other publications
"IT and the board of directors: An empirical investigation into the 'Governance questions' directors should ask about IT, JIS, 224, 2, Fall 2010, 147–172.
An exploration into the content of the compensation discussion & analysis document", Corporate Board, 5, 2, 2009, 6–15
The role of the board in IT governance: Current and desired oversight practices." International Journal of Business Governance and Ethics, 4, 4, 2009, 316–329.
Leveraging human intellectual capital through an employee volunteer program and service-learning: The case of Ford Motor Company of Canada." Journal of Intellectual Capital, 10, 1, 2009, 121–134.
Improving the board's involvement in corporate strategy: Directors speak out", International Journal of Business Governance and Ethics, V 3, no. 4, 2007, pp. 382–393.
A comparative analysis of mission statement content in secular and faith based hospitals", Journal of Intellectual Capital, Vol 8, No. 4, 2007, 682–694
Issues in Canadian board transparency", Corporate Board, Vol 3, No 1, 2007, pp. 43–48.
The performance impact of content and process in product innovation charters", Journal of Product Innovation Management, V24, No. 1, 2007, pp. 3–19.

Awards
 In 2009, Bart's CPA designation was elevated to FCPA (Fellow of the Institute of Chartered Professional Accountants).
 In 2011, Bart was awarded the TD Insurance Meloche Monnex Corporate Governance and Strategic Leadership Award.
 In 2012, Bart was the recipient of the Queen Elizabeth II Diamond Jubilee Medal awarded by MP David Sweet.

References

External links 
 Corporate Missions
 Chris Bart's Blog

York University alumni
University of Western Ontario alumni
Canadian educators
21st-century Canadian male writers